Halmstads pärlor - Samtliga hits! 1979-95 is a compilation album from Swedish pop group Gyllene Tider, released on 15 May 1995. The album was re-released in 1996, then with Gyllene Tider EP as bonus record.

In Sweden the album peaked at number one on the Swedish Albums Chart, staying in the charts for almost two years, and went on to be certified 5× Platinum. The album also entered the Top 10 of the Norwegian Albums Chart, peaking at number two.

Track listing

CD1
Det är över nu [3.47]
Sommartider [3.18]
Flickorna på TV 2 [3.50]
Ska vi älska, så ska vi älska till Buddy Holly [3.44]
(Dansar inte lika bra som) Sjömän [2.32]
Billy [5.20]
Marie i växeln [3.42]
När vi två blir en [3.05]
Kärleken är inte blind (Men ganska närsynt) [3.47]
(Kom så ska vi) Leva livet [3.41]
Det hjärta som brinner [3.00]
Ljudet av ett annat hjärta [3.50]
Tylö Sun [2.41]
(Hon vill ha) Puls [3.20]
Flickan i en Cole Porter-sång [3.48]
Vandrar i ett sommarregn [4.41]
Du är en gangster, älskling! [3.30]
Teaser Japanese [3.28]
Det är blommor som har fångat dej [5.10]
Kung av sand [4.40]
När alla vännerna gått hem [3.50]

CD2
Gå & fiska! [3.56]
Juni, juli, augusti [3.52]
Harplinge [3.44]
Faller ner på knä [3.38]

Certifications

References

1995 compilation albums
Gyllene Tider compilation albums